Coleophora cartilaginella is a moth of the family Coleophoridae. It has a disjunct distribution. It has been recorded from the Iberian Peninsula, northern Russia, Hungary, Ukraine, Serbia and North Macedonia. It is also known from southern Russia, central Asia, Iran and Afghanistan.

Adults are on wing in June.

The larvae feed on Astragalus albicaulis and Medicago species. They create a straw-coloured pistol case of up to 16 mm long. The mouth angle is about 45°. Larvae can be found from autumn to June of the following year.

References

cartilaginella
Moths described in 1872
Moths of Europe
Moths of Asia